Winneweer is a small village in the municipalities of Eemsdelta and Groningen in the Dutch province of Groningen.

The village was first mentioned in 1668 as "Winne-weer, een Logijs-plaets", and refers to an inn which was located near Garrelsweer, and is nowadays a pub. The etymology is unclear.

Before 1850, there was hardly any habitation in Winneweer. After 1850, industry started to settle in Winneweer. A saw mill turned into a wood factory, a dairy factory and a brickworks followed. Winneweer consists of about 50 houses.

Gallery

References

External links 
 

Populated places in Groningen (province)
Groningen (city)
Eemsdelta